Léon Eugène Joseph Thome (15 July 1857 – 14 April 1925) was a French equestrian. He competed in the mail coach event at the 1900 Summer Olympics, winning the silver medal. He was appointed as a chevalier of the Legion of Honour, and as a chevalier of the Order of Agricultural Merit.

References

External links
 

French male equestrians
Olympic equestrians of France
Equestrians at the 1900 Summer Olympics
Olympic silver medalists for France
Olympic medalists in equestrian
Medalists at the 1900 Summer Olympics
Chevaliers of the Légion d'honneur
Knights of the Order of Agricultural Merit
Sportspeople from Allier